That which is lethal is capable of causing death.

Lethal may also refer to:

Film 
 Lethal (film), a 2004 action thriller

Music 
 DJ Lethal (born 1972), Latvian musician
 Lethal (American band), an American heavy metal band
 Lethal (Argentine band), an Argentine heavy metal band
Lethal, a 1987 hip hop album by UTFO
 Lethal (album), a 1990 punk rock album by Cockney Rejects

People 
 Jay Lethal (born 1985), American professional wrestler
 "Lethal" Larry Cameron (1952–1993) former American professional football player and wrestler
 Leigh Matthews (born 1952), Australian rules footballer known as "Lethal Leigh"

See also 
 Deadly (disambiguation)
 Fatal (disambiguation)
 Lethal Weapon (disambiguation)